Asa Clapp (March 6, 1805 – March 22, 1891) was a United States representative from Maine.

Biography
Asa William Henry Clapp, son of wealthy merchant and state legislator Asa Clapp (1762–1848) was born in Portland on March 6, 1805. He graduated from Norwich University in 1823.  He engaged as a merchant in foreign and domestic commerce in Portland.

He was elected as a Democrat to the 30th Congress (March 4, 1847 – March 3, 1849).  He was not a candidate for renomination.  He was a delegate to the 1848 and in 1848 and 1852 Democratic National Conventions.

He then resumed his former business pursuits, also serving as a director of the Maine General Hospital and of the Portland Public Library until his death in Portland on March 22, 1891.  His interment was in Evergreen Cemetery.

References

1805 births
1891 deaths
Norwich University alumni
Politicians from Portland, Maine
Burials at Evergreen Cemetery (Portland, Maine)
Businesspeople from Maine
Democratic Party members of the United States House of Representatives from Maine
19th-century American politicians
19th-century American businesspeople